Events in the year 1832 in Belgium.

Incumbents
Monarch: Leopold I
Head of government: Félix de Muelenaere (to 20 October); Albert Joseph Goblet d'Alviella (from 20 October)

Events

 8 April – Engelbert Sterckx consecrated as Archbishop of Mechelen
 11 July
Order of Leopold established.
Provisional postal convention between Belgium and the Office of the Prince of Tour and Taxis signed in Frankfurt am Main.
 9 August – Leopold I of Belgium marries Louise of Orléans.
 20 October – Albert Joseph Goblet d'Alviella replaces Félix de Muelenaere as Prime Minister
 15 November to 23 December – Siege of Antwerp: Belgian army with French support invests Antwerp Citadel, held by Dutch forces.
 23 December – Siege of Antwerp concludes: Dutch forces removed from Antwerp Citadel.

Publications
 Almanach de poche de Bruxelles (Brussels, M.-E. Rampelbergh)
 Annuaire industriel et administratif de la Belgique par province: Province du Brabant (Brussels)

Art and architecture
Paintings
 Joseph De Cauwer, Prometheus Delivered by Hercules (now in the Museum of Fine Arts, Ghent)

Births
Date uncertain – Oswald Orth, philologist (died 1920)

 2 February – Gédéon Bordiau, architect (died 1904)
 8 March – William Henry James Weale, art historian (died 1917)
 24 March – Edouard Osy de Zegwaart, politician (died 1900)
 21 August – Charles-Joseph de Harlez de Deulin, Orientalist (died 1899)
 11 November – Paul Goethals, Archbishop of Calcutta (died 1901)
 10 December – Antoon Stillemans, bishop of Ghent (died 1916)
 13 December – Polydore de Keyser, Lord Mayor of London (died 1898)

Deaths

Date uncertain – William Cockerill (born 1757/9), industrialist
16 December – Charles van Hulthem (born 1764), politician and bibliophile

References

 
Belgium
Years of the 19th century in Belgium
1830s in Belgium
Belgium